KPS-75 is an archaeological site near Al-Karak in Jordan. It is a rock shelter on the northern edge of the Wadi al-Hasa basin, which was occupied by humans at least three times during the Early Epipalaeolithic period ( 25,000–19,000 BP). Stone tools found at the site are associated with the Nebekian and Qalkhan cultures. During the time the site was occupied, a small seasonal lake was located nearby, and its inhabitants mostly hunted gazelle, along with smaller numbers of equids, aurochs, wild goats, tortoises, hares, and birds.

References 

Archaeological sites in Jordan